SureSmile is a type of customized orthodontic arch wires used by orthodontists to straighten teeth.  The technique utilises 3-D imaging, treatment planning software and a robot to create the wires. The technique is reported in World Journal of Orthodontics to decrease the time required to complete orthodontic treatment by 34% and increase the precision of the results.

Design 
The orthodontists uses digital images of a patient's mouth and teeth using either a white light scanner or cone beam computed tomography (CBCT). The software tools the orthodontist takes the teeth and individually aligns them into the proper position.

Once the orthodontist has virtually designed the smile and bite, SureSmile software plans a route for moving teeth into the proper place and sends this information to a robot that bends and shapes the wires to the patient's configurations. The customized wire is then sent back to the orthodontist to be placed on the patient.

Lingual braces 
SureSmile has a lingual or behind teeth braces option called SureSmile QT.With lingual braces, brackets are adhered to the underside of the teeth on the top arch, bottom arch or both arches.  Most patients choose lingual braces for aesthetic reasons, as they cannot be seen. Orthodontists that offer lingual braces will often suggest putting lingual braces on the upper teeth and clear ceramic braces on the bottom though patients can choose to have lingual braces on both arches.

History 
The SureSmile technology was developed and is owned by OraMetrix, a company founded in 1998 by Friedrich (Fritz) Riemeier  and Dr. Rohit Sachdeva, through the merger of two medical technology companies, one U.S. based and the other German.  The company was launched globally in 1999 with the help of a $150,000 investment from STARTech Early Ventures LLC.  Other key investors include Brentwood Venture Capital, CenterPoint Ventures, Rho Ventures and STAR Ventures. 
 
The SureSmile System received 510K marketing clearance from the U.S. Food and Drug Administration (FDA) in November 2000.  In 2003, OraMetrix relocated its U.S. corporate headquarters from Dallas to a larger, 25,000-square-foot facility in Richardson, Texas.

References

External links 
 SureSmile website
 Orametrix website

Orthodontic appliances